The 2017–18 season is Arsenal de Sarandí's 17th consecutive season in the top-flight of Argentine football. The season covers the period from 1 July 2017 to 30 June 2018.

Players

Current squad
.

Transfers

In

Out

Loan in

Friendlies

Pre-season

Primera División

League table

Results by matchday

Copa Argentina

Copa Sudamericana

Second stage

Notes

References

Arsenal de Sarandí seasons
Arsenal de Sarandí